Song Qitao (born 30 January 1978) is a Chinese judoka. He competed in the men's half-heavyweight event at the 2000 Summer Olympics.

References

1978 births
Living people
Chinese male judoka
Olympic judoka of China
Judoka at the 2000 Summer Olympics
Place of birth missing (living people)